Leona "Qaša" Kvasnicová (born 1972) is a Czech dancer, choreographer and dance teacher. A sister of DJ Lucca (DJ).

Life and studies 

Kvasnicová was born in 1972 in Brno. As a child she was interested in gymnastics. She studied at JAMU in Brno. She also studied in Amsterdam Jazzshowmusical school and Rotterdamse Dansacademie in the Netherlands.

Dance career 
In 1987 she joined a dancing group P-4. She established her own club called Crazy Dancers in 1989. Together with Michal Popelka she discovered the Belgium style called New beat as a predecessor of disco. In the early 1990s she danced with a professional group UNO in ABC Theatre in Prague and went on tour in Germany. In 1992 she danced in the project Cutting the diamonds by the Swiss choreographer Parwin Hadinia in Basel. She won a first post for Discodance formation in Prostějov and six years later she was nominated the best dance-director in Olomouc. She took part in the dance movie Šakalí léta of the director Jan Hřebejk. In 1996 she started her second dance group called Freedance Group. She became a member of Bratislava dance theater and Balet Praha. She acted in Paris in 2001 and after she returned to Prague, she danced in several projects of Jan Kodet, Lenka Ottová and several commercial choreographers. In 2003 she started her third dance group called IF.

Choreography 
She made choreography for her dance groups, for tens of movies and TV shows. She was a choreographer for Miss ČR 1994 and 2008, the TV Nova‘s 10th anniversary celebration (2004), Česko hledá SuperStar II and III, and Sazka 50th anniversary. 
She made a lot of theatre musicals choreographies: Galileo, Excalibur, Elixír života in Prague, Kabaret in Plzeň, Balada pro banditu in Brno.

References

External links

1972 births
Living people
Czech choreographers
Czech female dancers
People from Brno
Women choreographers